"The Show Goes On" is a song by American recording artist Lupe Fiasco, released on October 26, 2010, as the lead single from his third studio album Lasers. Prominently built on the bassline of Pachelbel's Canon, the song was produced by Kane Beatz, and the melody of the song was based on the 2004 song "Float On" by Modest Mouse. The song features backing vocals from JR Get Money. It was released to iTunes on November 9, 2010, and debuted at No. 57 on the Billboard Hot 100, eventually reaching a peak of No. 9. It was released in the UK on February 20, 2011. The song was a major point of contention for the artist and a reason for the lengthy delay of the album, making the title fitting; as Lupe was told unequivocally by record producers: "If you don't do 'The Show Goes On', your album's not coming out." However, XXL named it 14th Best Song of 2011. The song was nominated for Best Rap Performance and Best Rap Song at the 54th Grammy Awards.

Background
Lupe Fiasco announced the name of the single at the Fiasco Friday protest on October 15, 2010. On that day, Lyor Cohen came down to play the single for the protest turned celebrating fan base situated outside Atlantic Records. In a NovaFM interview, he gave an analysis of the first verse. He went on to say, "For them it was 'why is he talking about the record label, but it's still a great song. For me, I was like 'No, that's my therapy... To give you this song... Now you have to make it a worldwide smash. You have to play it on the radio... So every time you hear it, you're going to hear me talking about your ass."

On February 28, 2011, what the Complex magazine published an interview with Lupe that detailed the background behind the single. 

In an interview with The Adelaide Tribune, Lupe expanded further on his feelings toward the record. 

Writing credits are given to Lupe Fiasco, Isaac Brock, Dustin Brower, Jonathon Brown, Dann Gallucci, Eric Judy and to producer Kane Beatz.

The song was released on Lupe Fiasco's website on October 26 for download. This marked the first officially planned released single from Lasers ("Shining Down" and "I'm Beamin" were leaks re-released as street singles). "The Show Goes On" appeared on the iTunes Music Store on November 9.

Music video
The music video for "The Show Goes On" was released on December 25, 2010. It was directed by Hiro Murai and shows Lupe backstage preparing for a performance. Contrary to popular belief , the skull and crossbones glove is actually associated with Mastermind Japan and not Lupe Fiasco's post-punk band, Japanese Cartoon. It was MTV's last Jam Of The Week of 2010. The video itself was nominated for MTV's VMA Award for Best Hip Hop Video.

Chart performance
"The Show Goes On" peaked at No. 9 on the Billboard Hot 100, making this song Lupe's second top ten hit and biggest hit to date. "The Show Goes On" is Lupe Fiasco's best-selling and highest-charting song to date. As of June 2011, the single has sold more than 3,000,000 digital units in the US.

Charts and certifications

Charts

Year-end charts

Certifications

References

External links
 

2010 singles
Lupe Fiasco songs
Songs written by Lupe Fiasco
Song recordings produced by Kane Beatz
Songs written by Kane Beatz
Songs written by Isaac Brock (musician)
Songs written by Eric Judy
Songs written by Dann Gallucci
2010 songs